Yuri Gennadievich Butsayev; born October 11, 1978) is a Russian former professional ice hockey winger. He played in the National Hockey League (NHL) with the Detroit Red Wings and the Atlanta Thrashers. He was drafted in the second round, 49th overall, by the Red Wings in the 1997 NHL Entry Draft. Yuri is the brother of the former NHL player Viacheslav Butsayev.

Playing career
Drafted from HC Lada Togliatti, Butsayev made his National Hockey League debut with the Red Wings during the 1999–2000 season, appearing in 57 games and scoring five goals.  After spending parts of the next two seasons with the Red Wings, Butsayev was traded to the Atlanta Thrashers along with a draft pick for defenceman Jiri Slegr.

After spending parts of two seasons with the Thrashers, Butsayev returned to Russia during the 2003 season and has played there ever since. Butsayev played only 99 games in the NHL 75 with the wings and 24 with the thrashers. He scored a total of 10 NHL goals.

Personal
In September 2009 Butsayev was found guilty and sentenced to 10 months of conditional imprisonment for rape in Finland. The sexual assault had happened in Asikkala in July 2009. Butsayev was imprisoned for more than a month, but was allowed to leave the country after receiving his sentence.

Career statistics

Regular season and playoffs

International

Awards and honours

References

External links
 

1978 births
Atlanta Thrashers players
Chicago Wolves players
Cincinnati Mighty Ducks players
Detroit Red Wings draft picks
Detroit Red Wings players
HC CSKA Moscow players
HC Dynamo Moscow players
HC Lada Togliatti players
HC MVD players
HC Sibir Novosibirsk players
Zauralie Kurgan players
Living people
Lokomotiv Yaroslavl players
Russian ice hockey left wingers
Torpedo Nizhny Novgorod players
Sportspeople from Tolyatti